Aspergillus filifer is a species of fungus in the genus Aspergillus. It is from the Nidulantes section. The species was first described in 2008. It has been reported to produce shamixanthones and varitriol.

References 

filifer
Fungi described in 2008